Pragathy Guruprasad is a Singaporean-American playback singer who has worked in Tamil language films. Brought up in Fremont, California, she finished as a runner-up in the Airtel Super Singer Junior 3 show, which aired from October 17th 2011 to October 26th 2012.

Personal life
Pragathi Guruprasad was born to Guruprasad and Kanaka on 14 September 1997 in Singapore, and she has an elder sister, Saiprithvi. In Singapore, her father taught Carnatic lessons, and since at the age of five, Pragathi had also begun training in carnatic music. Her family subsequently relocated to Fremont, California where she continued learning Carnatic and Hindustani music from both her father at first and then from a teacher, Sangeetha Swaminathan, a disciple of Sudha Raghunathan.

Career

In July 2014, she signed on to make her acting debut by portraying a supporting role in Bala's Tharai Thappattai (2016), but later opted out owing to her college commitments. In September 2016, Bala later announced that she would portray the lead role in his next project starring actor Yuvan. However the film was eventually shelved before production began.

In 2020, she made an appearance in a small role in the American comedy drama Never Have I Ever.
Pragathi sang the popular Tamil Sangam poetry 'Yayum Ngayum' for the album Sandham: Symphony Meets Classical Tamil by Composer Rajan Somasundaram, which in July 2020, was featured in Amazon's Top#10 International Music albums.

Discography

References

1997 births
Living people
Singaporean musicians
21st-century Singaporean women singers
American playback singers
People from Fremont, California
Singaporean emigrants to the United States
Tamil singers
Tamil playback singers
Singaporean people of Tamil descent
Singaporean people of Indian descent
American people of Indian Tamil descent
American women singers of Indian descent
Expatriate musicians in India
Singaporean expatriates in India
American expatriates in India
21st-century Singaporean musicians
21st-century American singers
21st-century American women singers